General elections were held in Tanzania on 29 October and 29 November 1995. They were the first multi-party general elections after the lifting of the ban on political parties other than Chama Cha Mapinduzi in 1992. Nevertheless, the CCM retained its control of the country, with its candidate Benjamin Mkapa winning the presidential election, and the party winning 186 of the 232 constituencies. 182 of the constituencies were on the mainland, and 50 on Zanzibar.

After the election, 37 additional seats for women MPs were awarded to the parties based on the proportion of seats in the National Assembly, while five members were elected by the House of Representatives of Zanzibar and ten members were nominated by the President. The Attorney General was also an ex-officio member, resulting in a total number of MPs of 285.

Voter turnout was 76.67% of the 8,929,969 registered voters.

Results

President

National Assembly

Presidential elections in Tanzania
Elections in Tanzania
Tanzania
General